Fyn-related kinase (FRK, formerly tyrosine protein kinase 5) is an enzyme that in humans is encoded by the FRK gene.

The protein encoded by this gene belongs to the TYR family of protein kinases. This tyrosine kinase is a nuclear protein and may function during G1 and S phase of the cell cycle and suppress growth.

Interactions
FRK has been shown to interact with retinoblastoma protein.

References

Further reading

Tyrosine kinases